Alepocephalus is a genus of slickheads found in all oceans.

Species

There are currently 20 recognized species in this genus:
 Alepocephalus agassizii Goode & T. H. Bean, 1883 (Agassiz' slickhead)

 Alepocephalus andersoni Fowler, 1934
 Alepocephalus antipodianus (Parrott, 1948) (Antipodean slickhead)
 Alepocephalus asperifrons Garman, 1899
 Alepocephalus australis Barnard, 1923 (Small scaled brown slickhead)
 Alepocephalus bairdii Goode & T. H. Bean, 1879 (Baird's smooth-head)

 Alepocephalus bicolor Alcock, 1891 (Bicolor slickhead)
 Alepocephalus blanfordii Alcock, 1892
 Alepocephalus dentifer Sazonov & Ivanov, 1979
 Alepocephalus fundulus Garman, 1899
 Alepocephalus longiceps Lloyd, 1909 (Longfin slickhead)
 Alepocephalus longirostris Okamura & Kawanishi, 1984 (Longsnout slickhead)
 Alepocephalus melas F. de Buen, 1961
 Alepocephalus owstoni S. Tanaka (I), 1908 (Owston's slickhead)
 Alepocephalus planifrons Sazonov, 1993

 Alepocephalus productus T. N. Gill, 1883 (Smalleye smooth-head)
 Alepocephalus rostratus A. Risso, 1820 (Risso's smooth-head)
 Alepocephalus tenebrosus C. H. Gilbert, 1892 (California slickhead)
 Alepocephalus triangularis Okamura & Kawanishi, 1984 (Triangulate slickhead)

 Alepocephalus umbriceps D. S. Jordan & W. F. Thompson, 1914 (Slickhead)

References

Alepocephalidae
Ray-finned fish genera
Marine fish genera
Taxa named by Antoine Risso